Mythri Movie Makers Pvt. Ltd is an Indian film production company established by Naveen Yerneni, Y. Ravi Shankar in 2015. It mainly produces and distributes Telugu films. 

Notable films produced by the company include Srimanthudu, Janatha Garage, Rangasthalam, Uppena, Pushpa: The Rise, Mathu Vadalara and Sarkaru Vaari Paata. In 2019, Mohan Cherukuri left the company and the production is now headed by Naveen Yerneni and Y. Ravi Shankar.

Productions

2015-2020 
The company's first production was Srimanthudu starring Mahesh Babu, Shruti Haasan, Jagapathi Babu, Rajendra Prasad, Mukesh Rishi, Sampath Raj, Harish Uthaman and directed by Koratala Siva. Set on a budget of 4070 crore with Koratala Siva both directing and writing its screenplay, Devi Sri Prasad composed the score and R. Madhi handled the cinematography.

Their second production was Janatha Garage starring N. T. Rama Rao Jr., Mohanlal, Samantha Ruth Prabhu, and Nithya Menon in lead roles. It was also directed by Koratala Siva. Devi Sri Prasad composed the score, and Tirru handled the cinematography.

In 2018 the company produced 3 movies. Rangasthalam, starring Ram Charan Teja, Samantha Ruth Prabhu, Aadhi Pinisetty, Jagapathi Babu and Prakash Raj in lead roles, was directed by Sukumar. Devi Sri Prasad composed the score, and R. Rathnavelu handled the cinematography. Their next film was Savyasachi starring Naga Chaitanya, R. Madhavan, Nidhhi Agerwal and Bhumika Chawla. This was followed by Amar Akbar Anthony starring Ravi Teja and Ileana D'Cruz and directed by Srinu Vaitla.

In 2019 the company produced 4 films. It first released Chitralahari starring Sai Dharam Tej and directed by Kishore Tirumala. Their next venture was Dear Comrade starring Vijay Deverakonda and Rashmika Mandanna. This was followed by Nani's Gang Leader starring Nani and Priyanka Arul Mohan. Their final release of the year was Mathu Vadalara starring Sri Simha and Naresh Agastya.

2020 - present 
In 2021 the production house released 2 movies; Uppena starring Panja Vaisshnav Tej and Krithi Shetty and Pushpa: The Rise. Both of these were blockbusters at the box office. Following the success of Pushpa, the house launched numerous high budget projects with multiple actors.

In 2022, more of their films were released: Sarkaru Vaari Paata, Ante Sundaraniki, Happy Birthday and Aa Ammayi Gurinchi Meeku Cheppali. Despite high expectations, all four films received a lukewarm response at the box office. The same year the production house announced projects with Chiranjeevi, Balakrishna, Vijay Deverkonda, Ram Charan, Jr.NTR, and Prabhas as well as announcing the second part of Pushpa.

Films

Awards and Nominations

References

External links
 Mythri Movie Makers Pvt. Ltd on YouTube

Indian companies established in 2014
Film production companies based in Hyderabad, India
2015 establishments in Telangana

Indian film studios